The 1957 Nippon Professional Baseball season was the eighth season of operation of Nippon Professional Baseball (NPB).

Regular season

Standings

Postseason

Japan Series

League leaders

Central League

Pacific League

Awards
Most Valuable Player
Wally Yonamine, Yomiuri Giants (CL)
Kazuhisa Inao, Nishitetsu Lions (PL)
Rookie of the Year
Motoshi Fujita, Yomiuri Giants (CL)
Tamotsu Kimura, Nankai Hawks (PL)
Eiji Sawamura Award
Masaichi Kaneda, Kokutetsu Swallows (CL)

See also
1957 Major League Baseball season

References